Ib Storm Larsen (later Storm, 28 September 1925 – 4 January 1991) was a Danish rower who competed in the 1948 Summer Olympics.

He was born in Faaborg and died in the Algarve, Portugal.

In 1948 he was a crew member of the Danish boat which won the silver medal in the coxless fours event.

External links
 profile

1925 births
1991 deaths
Danish male rowers
Olympic rowers of Denmark
Rowers at the 1948 Summer Olympics
Olympic silver medalists for Denmark
Medalists at the 1948 Summer Olympics
People from Faaborg-Midtfyn Municipality
Sportspeople from the Region of Southern Denmark